Eyralpenus kovtunovitchi is a moth of the family Erebidae. It was described by Vladimir Viktorovitch Dubatolov in 2011. It is found in Malawi.

References

 

Spilosomina
Moths described in 2011